KMMD-CD (channel 39), is a low-power, Class A television station licensed to Salinas, California, United States, serving the Monterey Bay area as an affiliate of Court TV. It is owned by CNZ Communications.

History

KMMD signed on as K03HB on January 5, 1993. The station was later granted Class A status in 2003.

On September 25, 2006, KMMD switched to the new MTV Tr3́s network (now simply known as Tr3́s since July 2010), which was created as a result of Viacom's acquisition of Mas Musica.

The station's digital signal was licensed as KMMD-LD on January 20, 2010, and received the Class A designation on September 28, 2011, with its call sign changing to KMMD-CD.

On October 3, 2011, the station surrendered its analog license to the Federal Communications Commission (FCC); the FCC cancelled the license and deleted the KMMD-CA call sign.

Subchannels
The station's digital signal is multiplexed:

References

External links

MMD-CD
Television channels and stations established in 1993
Low-power television stations in the United States